"Hunger" is a song by Swedish singer Molly Pettersson Hammar. The song was released in Sweden as a digital download on 13 February 2016, and was written by Hammar along with Anton Hård af Segerstad, Joy and Linnea Deb, and Lisa Desmond. It took part in Melodifestivalen 2016, and qualified to andra chansen from the second semi-final. In andra chansen, it was eliminated.

Track listing

Charts

Weekly charts

Release history

References

2016 singles
Songs written by Anton Hård af Segerstad
Melodifestivalen songs of 2016
Swedish pop songs
Warner Music Group singles
Molly Pettersson Hammar songs
Songs written by Linnea Deb
Songs written by Joy Deb
English-language Swedish songs